The women's shot put at the 2010 European Athletics Championships was held at the Estadi Olímpic Lluís Companys on 27 July.

Medalists

Records

Schedule

Results

Qualification
Qualification: Qualification Performance 17.50 (Q) or at least 12 best performers advance to the final

Final

References

 Qualification Results
 Final Results
Full results

Shot put
Shot put at the European Athletics Championships
2010 in women's athletics